Nannothemis, the Elfin Skimmer, is a genus in the dragonfly family Libellulidae containing one species, N. bella.
It is native to the eastern United States and Canada, and is the smallest dragonfly in North America. Males are powdery blue, while females are black and yellow, resembling a wasp.

References

Further reading

External links

 

Libellulidae
Articles created by Qbugbot